Puducherry taluk is one of four taluks in the Puducherry district of the union territory of Puducherry. It comprises the city of Pondicherry and villages of Ariyankuppam Commune. Puducherry taluk is further divided into three sub-taluks (firkas).

Firkas
There are 3 revenue blocks of the taluk.

Puducherry
The Puducherry firka consists exclusively of Puducherry.

Ariyankuppam
Ariankuppam contains the following revenue villages:
 Ariyankuppam
 Thimmanayakanpalayam
 Abishegapakkam
 Thavalakuppam
 Manavely
 Poornankuppam

Mudaliarpet
Mudaliarpet contains the following revenue villages:
 Kompakkam
 Murungapakkam
 Olandai
 Pudupalayam
 Thengaithittu

References

External links 
 Department of Revenue and Disaster Management, Government of Puducherry
 North East Monsoon 2009 - Action Plan

Taluks of Puducherry
Puducherry district